Thomas B. Craighead (1798–1862) was an American politician and lawyer from the state of Arkansas. He served in the Arkansas State Senate representing Crittenden and Mississippi Counties.

Early life
Craighead was born 1798 to the Reverend Thomas Craighead and his wife Elizabeth.

Craighead County
In 1859, Senator William A. Jones, who represented St. Francis and Poinsett Counties, introduced a bill to create a new county. This county would be created from portions of Poinsett, Greene, and Mississippi Counties. Craighead opposed the bill because it would remove a large section of fertile farmland from Mississippi County, and the tax revenue derive from it. Jones waited until Craighead was absent from the chamber to push for final passage of his bill. Unknown to Craighead, Jones amended the bill to name the new county Craighead County, possibly as a gesture of goodwill. In return, the new county seat was named Jonesboro.

References

1798 births
1862 deaths
Arkansas lawyers
Arkansas state senators
19th-century American politicians
19th-century American lawyers